The Goalkeeper's Fear of the Penalty is a 1972 German-language drama film directed by Wim Wenders. It is also known as The Goalie's Anxiety at the Penalty Kick. It was adapted from the novel with the same title by Peter Handke.

Plot
A goalkeeper is sent off during a game for dissent. He spends the night with a cinema cashier, whom he afterwards kills. Although a type of detective film, it is more slow moving and contemplative than other films of the genre. It explores the monotony of the murderer's existence and, like many of Wenders' films, the overwhelming cultural influence of America in post-war West Germany.

Origin of the title
Late in the movie, the goalkeeper and a traveling salesman attend a football game, and witness a penalty kick. The goalkeeper describes what it is like to face a penalty: should he dive to one side, and if he does will the kicker aim for the other? It is a psychological confrontation in which each tries to outfox the other.  In parallel with this, the goalkeeper, rather than go on the run, has returned to his home town and is living in plain sight.  He doesn't know if the police are looking for him in particular, and the police are not necessarily looking for someone who isn't trying to hide.

References

Further reading
 Tibbetts, John C., and James M. Welsh, eds. The Encyclopedia of Novels Into Film (2nd ed. 2005) pp 153–155.

External links
 Official website

 

1972 films
1972 drama films
German drama films
Austrian drama films
West German films
1970s German-language films
Films based on Austrian novels
Films based on works by Peter Handke
Films directed by Wim Wenders
Films set in West Germany
German association football films
Films with screenplays by Peter Handke
Films scored by Jürgen Knieper
1970s German films